Waiting... is an EP by the American rock band The Rockfords. It was released in January 2004 through Ten Club.

Overview
The Rockfords features members of Goodness and Pearl Jam. The EP was recorded in October 2003. The band worked with producer John Goodmanson, who also produced the band's debut album, The Rockfords. The EP was released in 2004 through Pearl Jam's website.

Track listing

Personnel
The Rockfords
Carrie Akre – vocals
Chris Friel – drums
Rick Friel – bass guitar
Mike McCready – guitar
Danny Newcomb – guitar

Production
Danger Island Music – design
John Goodmanson – production

References

2004 EPs
Albums produced by John Goodmanson
The Rockfords albums